Goin' Back to New Orleans is an album by New Orleans singer and pianist Dr. John.  It was released by Warner Bros. Records on June 12, 1992. The album won a Grammy award for Best Traditional Blues Album.

Musicians and vocalists on the album include the Neville Brothers, Al Hirt, Danny Barker, Alfred "Uganda" Roberts, Pete Fountain, Alvin "Red" Tyler, Chuck Carbo, Clyde Kerr, Jr., Kirk Joseph, and Jamil Sharif.

Track listing
"Litanie des Saints" (Mac Rebennack) - 4:44
"Careless Love" (Martha Koenig, Spencer Williams, W. C. Handy) - 4:10
"My Indian Red" - 4:47
"Milneburg Joys" (Charles Melrose, Jellyroll Morton, Leon Roppola, Paul Mayers) - 2:39
"I Thought I Heard Buddy Bolden Say" (Ferdinand Morton) - 2:29
"Basin Street Blues" (Spencer Williams) - 4:27
"Didn't He Ramble" (Hattie Bolten) - 3:28
"Do You Call That a Buddy?" (Don Raye, Wesley Wilson) - 3:54
"How Come My Dog Don't Bark (When You Come Around)" (Prince Partridge) - 4:09
"Goodnight Irene" (Huddie Ledbetter, John Lomax) - 4:11
"Fess Up" (Mac Rebennack) - 3:12
"Since I Fell for You" (Buddy Johnson) - 3:32
"I'll Be Glad When You're Dead, You Rascal You" (Sam Theard) - 3:25
"Cabbage Head" (Henry Roeland Byrd, Mac Rebennack) - 3:59
"Goin' Home Tomorrow" (Alvin Young, Fats Domino) - 3:01
"Blue Monday" (Dave Bartholomew) - 3:01
"Scald Dog Medley/I Can't Go On" (Huey "Piano" Smith/Dave Bartholomew, Fats Domino) - 2:58
"Goin' Back to New Orleans" (Joe Liggins) - 4:08

References

1992 albums
Dr. John albums
Albums produced by Stewart Levine
Warner Records albums